AUZ may refer to:
Australian Airlines, ICAO code
Aurora Municipal Airport (Illinois), IATA code
ISO 639-3 for Uzbeki Arabic